Rodney Smithson (born 9 October 1943) is an English former footballer who played for Oxford United and Arsenal. While at Oxford, he played 156 league games. After retirement, he went on to be player-manager at Witney Town.

References

External links
Rage Online profile

1943 births
English footballers
Association football defenders
Arsenal F.C. players
Oxford United F.C. players
English Football League players
Living people